Gimel is the third letter of the Semitic abjads, including Phoenician Gīml , Hebrew Gimel , Aramaic Gāmal , Syriac Gāmal , and Arabic   (in alphabetical order; fifth in spelling order).

In its Proto-Canaanite form, the letter may have been named after a weapon that was either a staff sling or a throwing stick (spear thrower), ultimately deriving from a Proto-Sinaitic glyph based on the hieroglyph below:
T14

The Phoenician letter gave rise to the Greek gamma (Γ), the Latin C, G, Ɣ and yogh , and the Cyrillic Г and Ґ.

Hebrew gimel

Variations

Hebrew spelling: 

Bertrand Russell posits that the letter's form is a conventionalized image of a camel. The letter may be the shape of the walking animal's head, neck, and forelegs. Barry B. Powell, a specialist in the history of writing, states "It is hard to imagine how gimel = "camel" can be derived from the picture of a camel (it may show his hump, or his head and neck!)".

Gimel is one of the six letters which can receive a dagesh qal. The two functions of dagesh are distinguished as either qal (light) or hazaq (strong). The six letters that can receive a dagesh qal are bet, gimel, daled, kaph, pe, and taf. Three of them (bet, kaph,  and pe) have their sound value changed in modern Hebrew from the fricative to the plosive by adding a dagesh. The other three represent the same pronunciation in modern Hebrew, but have had alternate pronunciations at other times and places. They are essentially pronounced in the fricative as ג gh غ, dh ذ and th ث. In modern Hebrew, the combination  (gimel followed by a geresh) is used in loanwords and foreign names to denote .

Significance
In gematria, gimel represents the number three.

It is written like a vav with a yud as a "foot", and is traditionally believed to resemble a person in motion; symbolically, a rich man running after a poor man to give him charity. In the Hebrew alphabet gimel directly precedes dalet, which signifies a poor or lowly man, from the Hebrew word dal (b. Shabbat, 104a).

The word gimel is related to gemul, which means 'justified repayment', or the giving of reward and punishment.

Gimel is also one of the seven letters which receive special crowns (called tagin) when written in a Sefer Torah. See shin, ayin, teth, nun, zayin, and tsadi.

The letter gimel is the electoral symbol for the United Torah Judaism party, and the party is often nicknamed Gimmel.

In Modern Hebrew, the frequency of usage of gimel, out of all the letters, is 1.26%.

Syriac gamal/gomal

In the Syriac alphabet, the third letter is  — Gamal in eastern pronunciation, Gomal in western pronunciation. It is one of six letters that represent two associated sounds (the others are Bet, Dalet, Kaph, Pe and Taw). When Gamal/Gomal has a hard pronunciation (qûššāyâ ) it represents , like "goat". When Gamal/Gomal has a soft pronunciation (rûkkāḵâ ) it traditionally represents , or Ghamal/Ghomal. The letter, renamed Jamal/Jomal, is written with a tilde/tie either below or within it to represent the borrowed phoneme , which is used in Garshuni and some Neo-Aramaic languages to write loan and foreign words from Arabic or Persian.

Arabic ǧīm 

The Arabic letter  is named   . It is written in several ways depending on its position in the word:

Pronunciation
In all varieties of Arabic, cognate words will have consistent differences in pronunciation of the letter. The standard pronunciation taught outside the Arabic speaking world is an affricate , which was the agreed upon pronunciation by the end of the nineteenth century to recite the Qur'an. Differences in pronunciation occur because readers of Modern Standard Arabic pronounce words following their native dialects.

Egyptians always use the letter to represent  as well as in names and loanwords, such as  "golf". However,  may be used in Egypt to transcribe ~ (normally pronounced ) or if there is a need to distinguish them completely, then  is used to represent , which is also a proposal for Mehri and Soqotri languages.

The literary standard pronunciations
: In most of the Arabian Peninsula, Algeria, Iraq, Levant. This is also the commonly taught pronunciation outside the Arabic speaking countries when Literary Arabic is taught as a foreign language.
: In the Levant, Southern Iraqi Arabic and Northwestern Africa.
: In Egypt, coastal Yemen (West and South), southwestern Oman, and eastern Oman.
: In Sudan and hinterland Yemen, as well as being a common reconstruction of the Classical Arabic pronunciation.

Non-literary pronunciation
: In eastern Arabian Peninsula in the most colloquial speech, however  or sometimes  to pronounce Literary Arabic loan words.

Historical pronunciation 
While in all Semitic languages, e.g. While there is variation in Modern Arabic varieties, most of them reflect this palatalized pronunciation except in coastal Yemeni and Omani dialects as well as in Egypt, where it is pronounced .

Character encodings

See also

The serif form  of the Hebrew letter gimel is occasionally used for the gimel function in mathematics.

References

External links

The Mystical Significance of the Hebrew Letters: Gimel

Phoenician alphabet
Hebrew letters